Leucadendron strobilinum, commonly called the peninsula conebush, is a plant species in the genus Leucadendron—forming part of the family Proteaceae. Confined to the Cape Peninsula, it reaches a height of up to  growing in southern, damp rocky slopes at an elevation of 500 to 1100m. Its conservation status is Near Threatened—a result of inappropriate fire management, fire-break clearing and alien plant invasions.

Appearance
A large, single-stemmed shrub reaching a height of up to 2.6m. It branches near the base and has dark-green elliptical leaves.

Ecology
As with all leucadendron, the peninsula conebush is dioecious. Flowering takes place between September and October, with flowers described as yeast scented. Seeds are stored on the (female) plant, an adaptation known as serotiny, to be released upon a fire occurring; the seeds are winged allowing for wind dispersal.

References

External links 
 World Flora Online detailed plant description

strobilinum
Endemic flora of South Africa
Flora of the Cape Provinces
Fynbos
Vulnerable flora of Africa
Conservation dependent plants
Taxonomy articles created by Polbot